Julien Gracq (27 July 1910 – 22 December 2007; born Louis Poirier in Saint-Florent-le-Vieil, in the French département of Maine-et-Loire) was a French writer. He wrote novels, critiques, a play, and poetry. His literary works were noted for their dreamlike abstraction, elegant style and refined vocabulary. He was close to the surrealist movement, in particular its leader André Breton.

Life
Gracq first studied in Paris at the Lycée Henri IV, where he earned his baccalauréat. He then entered the École Normale Supérieure in 1930, later studying at the École libre des sciences politiques (Sciences Po.), both schools of the University of Paris at the time.

In 1932, he read André Breton's Nadja, which deeply influenced him. His first novel, The Castle of Argol, is dedicated to that surrealist writer, to whom he devoted a whole book in 1948.

In 1936, he joined the French Communist Party but quit the party in 1939 after the Molotov–Ribbentrop Pact was signed.

During the Second World War, he was a prisoner of war in Silesia with other officers of the French Army.  One of the friendships he formed there was with author and literary critic Armand Hoog, who later described Gracq as a passionate individualist and ferociously anti-Vichy.

In 1950, he published a fierce attack on contemporary literary culture and literary prizes in the review Empédocle  titled La Littérature à l'estomac.  When he won the Prix Goncourt for The Opposing Shore (Le Rivage des Syrtes) the following year, he remained consistent with his criticism and refused the prize.

Gracq taught history and geography in secondary school (high school) until he retired in 1970.

In 1979, he wrote the foreword to a re-edition of the Journal de l'analogiste (1954) by Suzanne Lilar, a work he called a "sumptuous initiation to poetry" ("une initiation somptueuse à la poésie").

In 1989, Gracq's work was published by the Bibliothèque de la Pléiade.  He remained distant from major literary events and faithful to his first publisher, José Corti.

Gracq lived a quiet life in his native town of Saint-Florent-le-Vieil, on the banks of the river Loire. On 22 December 2007, a couple of days after suffering a dizzy spell, he died at the age of 97 in a hospital in Angers.

The Opposing Shore

The Opposing Shore (Le Rivage des Syrtes, 1951) is Julien Gracq's most famous novel.

A novel of waiting, it is set in an old fortress close to a sea which defines the ancestral border between the stagnant principality of Orsenna and the territory of its archenemy, the mysterious Farghestan. Its lonely characters are caught in a no man's land, waiting for something to happen and wondering whether something should be done to bring about change, particularly when change may mean the death of civilisations.

Works
Au château d'Argol, 1938 (novel) (English translation: The Castle of Argol)
Un beau ténébreux, 1945 (novel) (English translation: A Dark Stranger)
Liberté grande, 1946 (poetry) (English translation: Great Liberty)
Le Roi pêcheur, 1948 (play)
André Breton, quelques aspects de l'écrivain, 1948 (critique)
La Littérature à l'estomac, 1949
Le Rivage des Syrtes, 1951 (novel) (English translation: The Opposing Shore)
Prose pour l'Étrangère, 1952
Penthésilée, 1954 (play; translation of Kleist's Penthesilea)
Un balcon en forêt, 1958 (novel) (English translation: Balcony in the Forest)
Préférences, 1961
Lettrines, 1967
La Presqu'île, 1970
Le Roi Cophetua, 1970 (novel) (English translation: King Cophetua); it inspired the film Rendezvous at Bray, directed by André Delvaux
Lettrines II, 1974
Les Eaux Étroites, 1976 (Allusions, allegories and metaphors on a French river, l'Èvre.) (English title: The Narrow Waters)
En lisant en écrivant, 1980 (English translation: Reading Writing)
La Forme d'une ville, 1985 (English translation: The Shape of a City)
Autour des sept collines, 1988
Carnets du grand chemin, 1992
Entretiens, 2002
 La letteratura da voltastomaco, Milano, De Piante Editore, 2022, ISBN 979-12-803-6224-7

See also
Le Mondes 100 Books of the Century, a list which includes The Opposing Shore

References

Jean-Louis de Rambures, "Comment travaillent les écrivains", Paris 1978 (interview with J. Gracq)
 Encounters with Julien Gracq", by Gérard Bertrand
 Dominique Perrin, "De Louis Poirier à Julien Gracq", Paris, Classiques Garnier, 2009, 759 p.

External links

 Obituary in The Times, 31 December 2007

1910 births
2007 deaths
People from Maine-et-Loire
20th-century French novelists
21st-century French novelists
French fantasy writers
Writers from Pays de la Loire
Sciences Po alumni
École Normale Supérieure alumni
Lycée Henri-IV alumni
Prix Goncourt winners
French male novelists
20th-century French male writers
21st-century French male writers